The North Atlantic Treaty Organisation Military Committee (NATO MC) is the body of NATO that is composed of member states' Chiefs of Defence (CHOD). These national CHODs are regularly represented in the MC by their permanent Military Representatives (MilRep), who often are two- or three-star flag officers. Like the Council, from time to time the Military Committee also meets at a higher level, namely at the level of Chiefs of Defence, the most senior military officer in each nation's armed forces.

Role

The MC assists and advises the North Atlantic Council (NAC), Defence Planning Committee, and Nuclear Planning Group on military matters including policy and strategy. Its principal role is to provide direction and advice on military policy and strategy. It provides guidance on military matters to the NATO Strategic Commanders, whose representatives attend its meetings, and is responsible for the overall conduct of the military affairs of the Alliance under the authority of the Council. The executive body of the MC is the International Military Staff (IMS).

History
Until 2008 the Military Committee excluded France, due to that country's 1966 decision to remove itself from NATO's integrated military structure, which it rejoined in 1995. Until France rejoined NATO, it was not represented on the Defence Planning Committee, and this led to conflicts between it and NATO members. Such was the case in the lead up to Operation Iraqi Freedom.

Established in 1949 during the first Council session in Washington, the Military Committee is NATO's highest military authority and advises the NAC and NATO's strategic commanders, the Supreme Allied Commander Transformation and the Supreme Allied Commander Europe.

See also

Structure of NATO
International Military Staff
International Staff
Chairman of the NATO Military Committee
European Union Military Committee

References

External links